Carcasse is a village in the Anse d'Hainault, in the Grand'Anse department of Haiti.

References

Populated places in Grand'Anse (department)